Libro de la invencion liberal y arte del juego del axedrez (translation: "Book of the liberal invention and art of the game of chess") is one of the first books published about modern chess in Europe, after Pedro Damiano's 1512 book. It was written by Spanish priest Ruy López de Segura in 1561 and published in Alcalá de Henares.

Details 
In 1560 Ruy López visited Rome and read Damiano's book, which he found unsatisfactory. López's book contains general chess advice, rules of the game, and a discussion of the origin of the game. It also recommends some chess openings, and criticizes Damiano's games and analysis. The book was translated to Italian in 1584 and to French in the 17th century.

The book consists of four parts. The first part talks generally about chess, discusses the history, and gives the rules that were used in Spain at the time: stalemate was a win for the player not stalemated and a player could also win by capturing all of the opponent's pieces (except for the king). The book also introduced the fifty-move rule. In the second part, López introduces the word gambit and gives some openings that had not been previously published: the King's Gambit, some variations of the Bishop's Opening, and what is now known as the Steinitz Defense in the Ruy Lopez. The last two parts of the book are critical of the games of Damiano. After the moves 1.e4 e5 2.Nf3, Damiano thought that 2...Nc6 was Black's best move. López considered that inferior because of 3.Bb5. This opening is now known as the Ruy Lopez, although he did not invent it.

His book is also known for its tactical suggestion to place the chessboard so that the sun shines in your opponent's eyes.

See also 
Libro de los juegos

References 

Bibliography
Bibliotheca Van der Linde-Niemeijeriana, Catalogue Nr. 363
Images from the chess collection of the Bibliotheca Van der Linde-Niemeijeriana
Van der Linde, Antonius: Das Schachspiel des XVI. Jahrhunderts. Nach unedirten Quellen bearbeitet, Verlag von Julius Springer, Berlin 1874

External links
 Picture of the title page

Chess books
Spanish literature
16th century in chess